The Maid of Artois is an opera by Michael William Balfe, written in 1836 to a libretto by Alfred Bunn, manager of the Theatre Royal, Drury Lane in London, who based his work on Eugène Scribe's stage version of Abbé Prévost's novel Manon Lescaut.

Overview
The opera opened on 27 May 1836, starring Maria Malibran as the title character, Isoline. The story concerns a girl in love, who is poached by a rich Marquis. The lovers seem destined to end their days in the wastes of the desert, until an unexpected rescue comes. The opera received good notices, and the overture was much admired.

Balfe's music shows the influence of his earlier training in Italy, especially of Bellini and Donizetti, as well as the French works that Balfe had sung (as a baritone) at the Paris Opéra, where he and Malibran had appeared together. Balfe wrote The Maid of Artois partly as a vehicle for her. Malibran was a mezzo-soprano with a three octave range. She had died in September 1836 before the score was printed, and so Balfe decided to set brighter, higher versions of the coloratura and other music in her role that are more typical of operatic treatments of a youthful character such as Isoline.

Roles
Isoline contralto   
Jules tenor     
Marquis baritone    
Synnelet bass  
Coralie   
Sans Regret  
Martin     
Centinnel   
Count Saulnier

Musical numbers
Act 1
The grounds of a Parisian Chateau
1 Men – Drink, boys
2 Marquis –  Recit.   The Rosy hours
2a Marquis, Sans R, Chorus – Cavatina   Then silly is the heart
3  Andante
4 Jules – Recit.   Oh, if at times
4a  Jules – Cavatina    My soul, in one unbroken
5  Sans R & Jules – Here, take the contents
6   Coralie, Jules, Sans R, Men – Then thus oppress’d
7    Women – The sigh from her heart
8    Isoline – Recit.   My thoughts which forth
Isoline – The heart that once hath 
Isoline, Women – Oh could I but that peace
9 Isoline, Marquis – Oh! leave me not
9a  Isoline, Marquis – Oh, why should I weep
10  Isoline  – Yon moon o’er the mountains
11  Jules, Isoline, – Finale:   What sounds are those I hear
11a  Isoline, Jules, Marquis –  Finale: Trio  My bosom with hope
12   Marquis, Isoline, Jules –  Finale: Ensemble   Deceitful woman
Sans Regret, Chorus, Count      

Act 2
A fort in British Guiana
13  Men, Women and slaves –  Here’s to the Soldier Lover
14 Synnelet, Chorus –  Was there ever known
15 Ballet    
16  Isoline –  Oh! what a charm it is
17  Isoline, Jules, Nin, Syn, Chor  Quartet & Ch – From shore to shore   
18 Indian Dance
19  Isoline & Jules – And do these arms
19a  Jules, Isoline – I have strength to bear
19b Martin, Isol, Jules, Nin, Syn  Ensemble – Five minutes are expired
20  Chorus, Syn, Cent, Martin –  Finale  These joyous sounds upon the ear
21  Marquis –  Recit.   I gaze upon the stranger land
21a  Marquis – The light of the other days is faded
22  Chorus, Marquis, Synnelet –  Finale   Hail to the Chief

Act 3
In the Desert
23 Isoline –  Recit.   The sounds which have pursued
23a  Isoline –  Oh, beautiful night
24  Isoline, Jules –  There’s blood upon his arm
25  March  
26 Isoline, Chorus –  Finale:   The rapture swelling though my breast

References
  (pp. 32–34)

External links
  Description of the opera and of the 2005 recording by Victorian Opera Northwest, with links to a list of numbers and cast

Adaptations of works by Antoine François Prévost
Operas
English-language operas
Operas by Michael Balfe
Operas based on works by Eugène Scribe